The Ethiopian Republican Guard is a specialist armed unit, tasked with the protection of top public officials of Ethiopia and of their families.

History 

Ethiopia had an Imperial Guard during the reign of Emperor Haile Selassie, but the Derg disestablished it in 1974. Since 1991, Ethiopian leaders and officials have been protected by security details assigned by the Ethiopian National Intelligence and Security Service (NISS). The security arrangement did not, however, form a force specifically dedicated to this task.

The Republican Guard was established in summer 2018, following the explosion of a hand grenade in the middle of a crowd attending a speech in Addis Ababa of Prime Minister Abiy Ahmed on 23 June 2018. Alongside the June 2018 attack, the Office of Prime Minister linked the establishment of the Republican Guard to other disturbances occurred in Ethiopia.

Mission 
The Republican Guard is tasked with defending the Ethiopia’s constitution and constitutional order, specifically by protecting the highest level of Ethiopian leadership from threats and attempted attacks. In its specific objective, the Republican Guard is mandated to use any means necessary.

Organization 
The Republican Guard is described either as an army unit, either as being outside the Ethiopian National Defense Force, but answerable only to the Prime Minister.

At the time of its establishment, the Chief Commander of the Republican Guard was Brigadier general Birhanu Jula, later replaced by Major General Berhanu Bekele.

According to Michael Schmidt, the Guard is mostly staffed by soldiers of Oromo descent.

Branches 
As of 2021, the Republican Guard is structured on four different branches, tasked with various missions. The bulk of the Republican Guard members is tasked with protecting VIPs.
 Counter Military Unit: the Counter Military Unit is a militarily uniformed unit inside the Republican Guard that carries heavy assault rifles such as Tavor-21 and American M-4's and other heavy weapons such as long rang snipers that can penetrate bullet proof glass.
 Republican Guard Special Force: the Republican Guard Special Force is tasked with protecting any high level locations that are militarily, economically, and of national security importance such as Headquarters of the ENDF generals and high military officials.
 Republican Guard Military Police: the Military Police is tasked with dealing with security issue should the Federal Police fail.

Equipment 
The Republican Guards are armed with the Israel-made Tavor Tar-21 assault rifle and long range snipers. The Republican Guard also uses helicopters as well as armored vehicles to protect the Prime minister and President of Ethiopia. They carry hidden guns and use in ear communication. They are apart of the Ethiopian National Defense Force and participate in special operations with helicopters and are estimated to be in the thousands.

References 

Military units and formations of Ethiopia
Military units and formations established in 2018
2010s establishments in Ethiopia
Protective security units